Tongatea may refer to:

 Tongātea, sixteenth-century Māori chieftain of Ngāti Ruanui from southern Taranaki, New Zealand
 Tongatea, wife of Ngaru in the mythology of Mangaia of the Cook Islands

See also
 Manu-Tongātea